Jussi Välimäki (born 9 September 1974 in Tampere) is a Finnish rally driver, who scored eight World Rally Championship points during his career, with a best finish of fifth on the 2006 Rally d'Italia Sardegna.

Career

Välimäki's first World Rally Championship events came in 1998, in Sweden and Finland, behind the wheel of an Opel Astra GSi 16V. In 2000 he drove a Ford Escort WRC to 13th place on Rally Finland. In 2001 he contested the Junior World Rally Championship (JWRC) in a Peugeot 206 S1600, finishing third in the category in Finland and finishing the season ninth. He contested the 2002 JWRC season in a Citroën Saxo, but only managed a best finish of fifth on Rally GB, ending the year 15th in the classification. He also did two other WRC rounds in a Toyota Corolla WRC, but retired from both.

2003 saw Välimäki do four WRC rounds with the Hyundai team, but he retired from all four of them. He used the Hyundai Accent on four rounds of the 2004 season, finishing seventh on Rally Mexico. He also used a Ford Focus RS WRC 03 on Rallye Deutschland, finishing 14th. In 2005, Välimäki won the FIA Asia-Pacific Rally Championship, with five wins from seven rallies.

Välimäki returned to top-class WRC action in 2006, entering three rounds with a Mitsubishi Lancer WRC05. He used it to finish fifth on Rally d'Italia Sardegna, before finishing ninth in Greece and seventh in Finland.

In 2007, Välimäki won the Finnish Rally Championship, and was runner-up in the following season. In 2009 he contested the Chinese Rally Championship.

In 2011 Välimäki announced he was ending his active rallying career.

WRC results

JWRC Results

PWRC results

References

Living people
1974 births
Sportspeople from Tampere
Finnish rally drivers
World Rally Championship drivers
Intercontinental Rally Challenge drivers
Citroën Racing drivers
Hyundai Motorsport drivers